David Brandon Geeting (born 1989) is a photographer and artist from New York City. His work is often characterized by its use of surrealist still life images, experimental portraiture, commercial outtakes, and happenstance captures.

Early life and education 
Geeting graduated from New York's School of Visual Arts in 2011.

Career 
Geeting has named William Eggleston and Roe Ethridge as two important artists who influenced his work. He has been commissioned to take photographs for publications such as The New York Times, Vogue, and Time.

In 2015, his monograph Infinite Power was published by Pau Wau Publications. In 2017, his second book Amusement Park was published by Lodret Vandret.

Journalist Michael Paulson considered Geeting as a skilled artist in "object portraiture".

Exhibitions 
2018: Amusement Park, Janet Borden (New York City)
2020: Neighborhood Stroll, Janet Borden (New York City)
2022: The Marble, 10 14 Gallery (London)

Books 
Infinite Power. Pau Wau Publications, 2015.
Amusement Park. Lodret Vandret, 2017.
Neighborhood Stroll. Skinnerboox and Same Paper, 2019. 
(With Lina Sun Park). A Spell Too Far. Same Paper, 2021.

Personal life 
Geeting lives in New York City with his partner Lina Sun Park.

References

External links 
 

1989 births
Photographers from New York (state)
21st-century American photographers
Living people